Tunkwa Provincial Park (sometimes known as Tunkwa Lake Provincial Park) is a provincial park in British Columbia, Canada, located on the northern Thompson Plateau between the towns of Logan Lake (S) and Savona (N).

External links
 British Columbia outdoor community

References

Provincial parks of British Columbia
Thompson Country